Ruler on Ice (foaled April 2, 2008) is a Thoroughbred racehorse that won the 2011 Belmont Stakes. He was bred and foaled in Kentucky by Brandywine Farm in partnership with Liberation Farm on. He is a chestnut gelding sired by Hill 'n' Dale Farms' Roman Ruler out of the Saratoga Six-bred mare, Champagne Glow. The colt was consigned as lot 988 at the 2009 Keeneland September yearling auction,  where he was purchased by George and Lori Hall for $100,000. Ruler on Ice only won one minor race after winning the Belmont and was retired from racing in July 2014. He lives in Versailles, Kentucky at the farm of his owners.

Racing career
Ruler on Ice raced thirteen times on ten different tracks, and of his three wins, two were over sloppy tracks. His trainer for all of his starts was Kelly J. Breen who was based out of Monmouth Park.

2010: two-year-old season
Racing as a two-year-old, Ruler on Ice made his first start was in a maiden race at Monmouth Park on September 19, 2010. He finished fifth in a field of seven horses and was ridden by jockey Joe Bravo. In his next start, a six-furlong maiden race at Delaware Park on October 4, 2010, he won by a head over four other horses and collected $22,800.

2011: three-year-old season
Racing as a three-year-old, Ruler on Ice was second at an optional claiming race and won an allowance race on February 22, 2011.  On May 7, he was a fast-closing second in the Federico Tesio Stakes at Pimlico, beaten by Concealed Identity. On March 27, 2011, he finished third in the Grade III Sunland Derby to Twice the Appeal and Astrology.

Triple Crown races
Ruler on Ice went into the Belmont Stakes, the third leg of the US Triple Crown, on June 11, 2011, without running in the Kentucky Derby or the Preakness Stakes. He was a 24–1 longshot to the favorites, Animal Kingdom and Irish colt Master of Hounds, and he was wearing blinkers for the first time. The colt won the 2011 Belmont Stakes in the slop, beating both Animal Kingdom (winner of the 2011 Kentucky Derby) and Shackleford (winner of the 2011 Preakness Stakes), who finished sixth and fifth, respectively. With this victory, Ruler on Ice became one of the few geldings to ever win the Belmont.

Remainder of the season
On July 31, 2011, Ruler on Ice finished third in the Haskell Invitational to Coil and Shackleford by two and a half lengths. He ran with his stablemate, Pants On Fire, in a duo dubbed "Fire and Ice" by the press. Pants On Fire finished out of the money in fifth place. On August 27, 2011, Ruler on Ice came in fourth in the 2011 Travers Stakes. On September 24, 2011, he finished second to To Honor and Serve in the 2011 Pennsylvania Derby. He was third at the 2011 Breeders' Cup Classic behind Game on Dude and the 2010 Belmont Stakes winner, Drosselmeyer.

2012: four-year-old season
Ruler on Ice finished eighth out of eleven horses in the Donn Handicap run at Gulfstream Park on February 11. Five months later on July 25 at Saratoga, Ruler finished seventh in an allowance race and was second to Win Willy in a similar race at Delaware Park in August. Entered in the Jockey Club Gold Cup, his only graded race of the year, Ruler challenged the front runners until a half-mile into the race when his gait became more choppy and his jockey Alan Garcia eased him out of the race.

2013: five-year-old season
On January 30, Ruler on Ice won an optional claiming race at Aqueduct Racetrack, his first since the Belmont. He was fifth out of seven starters in the Grade 3 Excelsior Handicap at Aqueduct Racetrack in March. Ruler finished fourth in an allowance race at Parx Casino and Racing in April.

Ruler on Ice was retired from racing in July 2014 and lives at the farm of his owners in Versailles, Kentucky.

Pedigree
Ruler on Ice's sire, Roman Ruler (2002 – 2017), was the winner of the 2004 Norfolk Stakes and Best Pal Stakes and won the Haskell Invitational Handicap as a three-year-old, accumulating $1,220,800 in his racing career. Roman Ruler was sired by 2000 Kentucky Derby winner Fusaichi Pegasus out of the unraced mare Silvery Swan by Silver Deputy. Silvery Swan also produced the 2000 Cigar Mile Handicap and multiple Del Mar Mile Handicap winner El Corredor. Roman Ruler was the leading second-crop sire by cumulative earnings in 2010 and sired Champagne Stakes winner Homeboykris in his first season at stud.

His dam, Champagne Glow (1988 – 2019), was second in the 1990 Frizette Stakes and won the Schuylkill Stakes. Ruler on Ice was her thirteenth foal. She also produced the fillies Lost on Champagne and Champagne d'Oro (winner of the 2010 Grade I Acorn Stakes and Grade I Test Stakes), and both fillies were third-place finishers in the Cinderella Stakes. Champagne Glow was sired by Saratoga Six, who was undefeated as a two-year-old and was the 1984 Del Mar Futurity winner. He also sired the Grade I winner Toga Toga Toga and Saratoga Gambler before dying in a 2006 barn fire at the JEH Stallion Station in Hondo, New Mexico, that also claimed the life of 1997 Horse of the Year Favorite Trick. Champagne Glow's dam, Champagne Ginny, was a winner in eight of her starts and won the Boiling Springs Handicap. She produced five foals, four of which were winners. Champagne Glow was euthanized in October 2019 at 31-years-old.

Racing statistics

References

External links
 Ruler on Ice, partial stats and pedigree

Belmont Stakes winners
2008 racehorse births
Racehorses bred in Kentucky
Racehorses trained in the United States
Thoroughbred family 14-a